Qionghai Bo'ao Airport  is an airport serving the city of Qionghai in Hainan Province, China. The airport received approval from the national government in January 2013, and was opened on 17 March 2016 after three years of construction.

History
The airport also serves rising tourism to the province of Hainan. A feasibility study on the airport was approved by government officials in December 2012, followed by the master plan in May 2013. A groundbreaking ceremony was held on 17 March 2015.

After a test flight in March 2016, the airport received its first commercial flight a Hainan Airlines Boeing 737 from Beijing on 17 March 2016. For a short period thereafter, the airport remained open to domestic charter flights carrying Boao Forum attendees. After the forum, the Qionghai airport closed so that a new international terminal and a  runway extension could be completed before the next forum. The airport reopened on 29 December 2016, receiving an Air Guilin flight from Guilin.

Facilities
Qionghai Airport has a 3,200-meter runway capable of handling large jet aircraft, a 9,000 square-meter terminal building, and 26 aircraft parking aprons. It is designed to handle 480,000 passengers and 1,440 tons of cargo annually by 2020.

Airlines and destinations

References

Airports in Hainan
Airports established in 2016
2016 establishments in China